Harry Owen may refer to:
Harry Owen (rugby league, Widnes) (1907–1966), rugby league footballer who played in the 1920s, 1930s, and 1940s 
Harry Owen (rugby league, Castleford), rugby league footballer who played in the 1920s
Harry Collinson Owen (1882–1956), British journalist and author
Harry Owen (gymnast), competed in Gymnastics at the 2014 Commonwealth Games – Men's artistic team all-around

See also
Henry Owen (disambiguation)
Harry Owens (1902–1986), American musician
Harold Owen (1897–1971), brother of Wilfred Owen